Dr. István Magyar (6 February 1864 – 8 September 1954) was a Hungarian jurist, who served as Crown Prosecutor of Hungary from 1930 to 1934.

References
 Magyar Életrajzi Lexikon

1864 births
1954 deaths
People from Prešov
Hungarian jurists